Rita de Jong (born 12 March 1965 in Meerkerk) is a Dutch rower. She competed at the 1992 Summer Olympics as a member of the Netherlands women's double sculls team which finished in 10th place and at the 1996 Summer Olympics as a member of the women's eight team which finished in 6th place.

See also 
 Netherlands at the 1992 Summer Olympics#Rowing
 Netherlands at the 1996 Summer Olympics#Rowing

References 
 
 

1965 births
Living people
Dutch female rowers
Rowers at the 1992 Summer Olympics
Rowers at the 1996 Summer Olympics
Olympic rowers of the Netherlands
People from Zederik
World Rowing Championships medalists for the Netherlands
20th-century Dutch women
21st-century Dutch women
Sportspeople from Utrecht (province)